The Atlantic Basin is the Atlantic Ocean.

Atlantic Basin may also refer to:
 Atlantic Basin Iron Works, an ironworks that operated in Brooklyn, New York, in the early to mid-20th century
 Atlantic Basin, an earlier name of Brooklyn Cruise Terminal